Thought Chamber is an American progressive metal supergroup formed in 2006. The band was formed by guitarist Michael Harris and vocalist Ted Leonard of Enchant. 

The band's first full-length album, "Angular Perceptions" was released in 2007 on progressive label InsideOut and received critical acclaim, including Honorable Mention from drum legend Mike Portnoy in his Top 10 Albums of 2007. Thought Chamber released their second full-length opus, a concept album entitled "Psykerion", in 2013 featuring founding members, guitarist Michael Harris and vocalist Ted Leonard, along with new drummer Mike Haid, bassist Jeff Plant, and keyboardist Bill Jenkins (Enchant). Progressive Metal web site, Grande Rock, voted "Psykerion" Best Album of 2013, and voted "Transcend" Best Song of 2013. In early 2014, Mike Portnoy invited Thought Chamber vocalist, Ted Leonard, to tour with his progressive band, Transatlantic, to fill in for Daniel Gildenlöw (Pain of Salvation) who was recovering from unexpected health issues. Ted also performed with Transatlantic, and Spock's Beard in Feb 2014 on the Progressive Nation at Sea cruise. In March 2014, InsideOut Music released the first-ever Thought Chamber video, "Transcend" which was filmed in Dallas, TX in September 2013.
Thought Chamber has been invited to perform at the Sold Out ProgPower USA Festival in Atlanta in September 2014.

Members
 Ted Leonard - Vocals (Spock's Beard, Enchant)
 Michael Harris - Guitars, Keyboards, Vocals (Darkology, Arch Rival and Vitalij Kuprij)
 Mike Haid - Drums (Michael Harris, David T. Chastain, Joe Stump)
 Jeff Plant - Bass (of Jimi Tunnell's Trilateral Commission)
 Bill Jenkins - Keyboards (of Enchant)

Past members
 Derek Blakley - Bass (of Haji's Kitchen and Michael Harris)
 Rob Stankiewicz - Drums (of Haji's Kitchen and Michael Harris)
 Bobby Williamson - Keyboards (of Eumeria and Outworld)

Discography
 Angular Perceptions - album, 2007
 Psykerion - album, 2013

References

External links
 Official Myspace
 Official Facebook Page
 Encyclopaedia Metallum page

American progressive metal musical groups
Inside Out Music artists